Prince Charles Elementary School may refer to:

Prince Charles Elementary School (Abbotsford), British Columbia, Canada
Prince Charles Elementary School (Saint John), New Brunswick, Canada
Prince Charles Elementary School (Surrey), British Columbia, Canada
Prince Charles Elementary School (Belleville), Ontario, Canada